The Opera Tower is a 23-story building in Tel Aviv, Israel completed in 1993.

Skyscrapers in Tel Aviv